This is an episode list for the 1981 season of the radio drama series CBS Radio Mystery Theater. The series premiered on CBS on January 6, 1974, and ended on December 31, 1982. A set of 1,399 original episodes aired between January 1974 and December 1982. The series was broadcast every day of the week for the first six years with re-runs filling in empty slots starting in February 1974. All episodes are available free at the Internet Archive.

List of episodes

1981 episodes

January

February

March

April

May

June

July

August

September

October

November

December

References

Sources
 

Lists of radio series episodes
1981 radio dramas